Prakash Saput is a Nepalese singer, composer, model, and actor, known for his contribution towards Nepali folk music. He is known for raising social and political awareness through his music. He gained recognition from the mass with the song Bola Maya in 2018. Since then he has sung songs like Mero Pani Haina Ra Yo Desh and Pir.

Personal life 
Prakash Saput comes from a Dalit family. Since his childhood, he has enjoyed singing and dancing in local occasions in his village. When he was a kid, he wanted to be an actor. He also worked as a radio jockey for Dhaulagiri FM, where he hosted a program called Just for You, where his responsibilities involved writing and presenting plays, as well as recording and mixing audio. He eventually relocated to Kathmandu, where he was able to pursue his singing career.

Career 
Prakash Saput released his debut album in 2011. Gari Khana Deu, his first song, was about social issues. However, his first release was Musu Musu Hasi Deu, which was a folk song. Nearly a decade later, he gained recognition of a mass audience with the releases of songs like Bola Maya in 2018, Galbandi Chyatiyo in 2019, Phuteka Chura in 2020, Mero Pani Haina Ra Yo Desh in 2021, and Pir in 2022.

Partial discography 
All songs are credited as singer unless otherwise noted.

Filmography 
Credited as an actor, unless otherwise noted.

Key

See also 
 Dohori
 Music of Nepal

References

External links

Living people
21st-century Nepalese male singers
People from Baglung District
Dohori singers
Nepalese folk musicians
Khas people
Nepali-language singers
Year of birth missing (living people)
Nepali radio presenters